James Harry Roberts (1 July 1864 – 11 August 1911) was an English cricketer. Roberts was a left-handed batsman. He was born in Walton, (now in Liverpool), Lancashire and was educated at Uppingham School.

Roberts toured South Africa with Major Warton's team in 1888/89, playing one match on the tour. He didn't feature in either of the two matches against South Africa which were later given Test status. He later made a single first-class appearance for Middlesex in the 1892 County Championship against Sussex at the County Ground, Hove. He batted once scoring 35 runs in Middlesex's first-innings, before being dismissed by Fred Tate. This was his only first-class appearance for the county.

He died at Bexhill-on-Sea, Sussex on 11 August 1911.

References

External links
James Roberts at ESPNcricinfo
James Roberts at CricketArchive

1864 births
1911 deaths
Cricketers from Liverpool
People educated at Uppingham School
English cricketers
Middlesex cricketers
People from Walton, Liverpool